The Open V33 Grand Lyon was a golf tournament on the European Tour which was played annually from 1992 to 1994. It was played at Golf Club de Lyon in Villette-d'Anthon near Lyon, France.

Winners

External links
Coverage on the European Tour's official site

Former European Tour events
Defunct golf tournaments in France